Shchekotovskaya is a rural locality (a village) in Yavengskoye Rural Settlement, Vozhegodsky District, Vologda Oblast, Russia. The population was 14 as of 2002.

Geography 
Shchekotovskaya is located 14 km northwest of Vozhega (the district's administrative centre) by road. Padinskaya is the nearest rural locality.

References 

Rural localities in Vozhegodsky District